The Big League World Series (BLWS) Europe–Africa Region was one of five International regions that sent teams to the World Series. Little League Baseball discontinued the Big League division in 2016. The region's participation in the BLWS had dated back to 1970.

Europe-Africa Region Countries

Region Champions

Results by Country

See also
Europe–Africa Region in other Little League divisions
Little League
Intermediate League
Junior League
Senior League

References

Big League World Series
Europe-Africa